Romanenko is a Ukrainian surname which is derived from the first name Roman (Роман).  It can refer to the following people:

 Alexei Romanenko, Russian-American cellist
 Prokofy Romanenko (1897–1949), Soviet general
 Roman Romanenko (born 1971), Russian cosmonaut, son of Yuri Romanenko
 Tetyana Romanenko, Ukrainian football striker
 Vitali Romanenko (1926 – 2010), Ukrainian sport shooter
 Vladimir Romanenko (born 1987), Russian professional footballer
 Volodymyr Romanenko, professional Ukrainian football midfielder
 Vsevolod Romanenko (born 1977), Ukrainian football player
 Yuri Romanenko (born 1944), Soviet cosmonaut 

and fictional characters:
 Nastasha Romanenko, fictional character in the Metal Gear series

See also
 

Ukrainian-language surnames